Adolphe “Adolf” Gaston Abel (27 November 1882 – 3 November 1968) was a German architect. He competed in the 1928 Summer Olympics.

Over the years, Abel taught at the University of Stuttgart, was the Director of Town Planning in Cologne, earned his PhD at the Technical University of Munich, taught at the Technische Universität Darmstadt, designed the RheinEnergieStadion and Mülheim Bridge, as well as buildings at the Koelnmesse and Cologne University.

References

1882 births
1968 deaths
19th-century German architects
Olympic competitors in art competitions